Actias chrisbrechlinae is a moth in the family Saturniidae. It is found in China  (Yunnan, Sichuan and Guangxi).

References

chrisbrechlinae
Moths described in 2007
Moths of Asia